Edward Eisner FRSE FIP (1929-1987) was a Hungarian-born physicist who was Professor of Applied Physics at the University of Strathclyde 1968-1987. He specialised in the physics of sound.

The "Edward Eisner Memorial Fund Award" is named in his honour.

Life

He was born in Sárvár in Hungary on 20 December 1929.

He came to Britain with his family in the 1930s and attended the George Herbert Strutt School in Belper in Derbyshire from 1939. He won a place at Cambridge University studying Physics and graduated BA in 1950, gaining a doctorate (PhD) in 1954. From 1954 he worked with the Ministry of Power at Buxton. In 1960 he went to America to work with the Bell Telephone Laboratory in New Jersey, working on the improvement of handsets. In 1968 he returned to Britain to take the chair in Applied Physics at Strathclyde University retaining this role until death. He was replaced by Prof Gordon Donaldson.

In 1969 he infamously wrote an open letter to NASA suggesting how to improve their television broadcasts from the moon.
In 1977 he was elected a Fellow of the Royal Society of Edinburgh. His proposers were Kenneth Jack Standley, Nicholas Kemmer, Simon G G MacDonald, and William Cochran.
He died on Christmas Day 1987.

References

1929 births
1987 deaths
20th-century British physicists
Fellows of the Royal Society of Edinburgh
Alumni of the University of Cambridge
Academics of the University of Strathclyde
Hungarian emigrants to the United Kingdom